Saint-Saulve is a commune in the Nord department in northern France.

The town is named after Saint Salvius of Amiens (died ), a bishop of Amiens.

Population

Heraldry

See also
Communes of the Nord department

References

Saintsaulve